Sayenko or Saienko (Ukrainian: Саєнко, Russian: Саенко) is a gender-neutral Ukrainian surname.

It may refer to: 
Aleksandr Sayenko (born 1978), Russian football player
Inna Sayenko (born 1982), Ukrainian hammer thrower
Mike Sayenko (born 1984), American long-distance runner 
Oleksandr Saienko (born 1984), Ukrainian businessman and politician
Viktor Sayenko, one of Dnepropetrovsk maniacs

See also
 

Ukrainian-language surnames